Neuhauser Straße is part of the first and largest pedestrian zone in Munich's Old Town. Here, many retail shops and restaurants are to be found.

Location and direction 
The road runs almost straight ahead in the southeast-northwest direction out of town, from the intersection Färbergraben, or Augustinerstraße, to Karlsplatz (Stachus). It has a length of about 350 meters. In the direction of Marienplatz, Neuhauser Straße becomes Kaufingerstraße. Below the Neuhauser Straße and the Kaufingerstraße are the main lines of the S-Bahn that runs between the stops Marienplatz and Karlsplatz.

History 

The street exists since at least 1293 (first mention) and was called Karlstraße from 1815 to 1828, then Neuhausergasse. It was rebuilt in 1972 from a main traffic connection with two tram-rails into a pedestrian zone; the reason for this was the 1972 Olympic Games with a huge influx of additional traffic to be expected. The street is named after the former village and today's Neuhausen district, where the road leads out of town. South along the road is the Angerviertel (Angers quarter) and north the Hackenviertel (Hacken quarter).

Buildings (selection) 

 No. 2 is the former Augustinerkirche, which belonged to Augustinerkloster (Augustiner Monastery); today there are the German Hunting and Fishing Museum and shops, in the annex behind the offices of the Polizeipräsidium München (police headquarter) (Ettstraße 2-4).
 No. 6: St. Michael's church building.
 No. 8: Old Academy (Wilhelminum), former Jesuit College, where, from 1956 to 2012, the service building Bavarian State Office for Statistics and Data Processing was located in front of this building is the Richard Strauss Fountain, in the west wing was the Department store Hettlage
 No. 17: former commercial building H. Ehrlicher, now department store Zweiflers
 No. 18: department store Oberpollinger, formerly Karstadt
 No. 20: Fountain Satyrherme mit Knabe (so-called Brunnenbuberl)
 No. 21: new store from SportScheck
 No. 14: Bürgersaalkirche (Citizens' Hall Church)
 No. 27: Restaurant Augustinerbräu in a painted neo-Renaissance semi-detached house.
 No. 39: Saturn department store and a perfumery, former Hertie department store

Shortly before the Karlsplatz is the Karlstor (Neuhausertor).

References

External links 

 Neuhauser Straße and Kaufingerstraße, muenchen.de

Streets in Munich
Buildings and structures in Munich
Historicist architecture in Munich